Aeschronectida is an extinct order of mantis shrimp-like crustaceans which lived in the Mississippian subperiod in what is now Montana.

References

Prehistoric Malacostraca
Crustacean orders
Prehistoric arthropod orders
Mississippian first appearances